Yuliya Andriychuk (born May 17, 1992) is a Ukrainian handballer playing in the Turkish Women's Handball Super League for Ardeşen GSK. She played for Ukrainian national team. The  sportswoman plays in the left back position.

Career
Andriychuk played in her country for Podatkova-Istil (2008–2010) and Podatkova University (2010–2012) before she moved to Russia to join HC Lada Togliatti (2013–2014). After one season, she moved to the Belarusian team HC Gomel (2014–2015). In July 2015, she transferred to Ardeşen GSK in Rize, Turkey to play in the Turkish Women's Super League.

She was member of the Ukraine women's national beach handball team at the 2013 and 2019 European Beach Handball Championship.

She took part at the 2014 European Women's Handball Championship qualification.

References

1992 births
Sportspeople from Kyiv
Living people
Ukrainian female handball players
Beach handball players
Ukrainian expatriate sportspeople in Belarus
Ukrainian expatriate sportspeople in Russia
Ukrainian expatriate sportspeople in Turkey
Expatriate handball players in Turkey
Ardeşen GSK players